The Denmark women's youth national handball team is the national under–17 handball team of Denmark. Controlled by the Danish Handball Federation, it represents Denmark in international matches.

History

Youth Olympic Games record

World Championship record

European Championship record

Team

Coaching staff

References

External links 
 The Danish Handball Association 

Handball in Denmark
Women's national youth handball teams
Handball